Roman Jozef Jakóbczak (born 26 February 1946) was a Polish football midfielder who participated at the FIFA World Cup 1974. He was a member of Poland national football team (5 matches/2 goals) in that time. The club he was connected most time was Lech Poznań. After his football career, he became a football manager.

References

1946 births
Living people
People from Września County
Sportspeople from Greater Poland Voivodeship
Association football midfielders
Polish footballers
Lech Poznań players
Pogoń Szczecin players
Śląsk Wrocław players
LB Châteauroux players
Red Star F.C. players
FC Rouen players
Canet Roussillon FC players
Ligue 2 players
1974 FIFA World Cup players
Poland international footballers
Polish football managers
Lech Poznań managers